DYUM (89.7 FM), on-air as 89.7 JU FM Radyo Bandera, is a radio station owned and operated by the Municipal Government of Mabinay. It is an affiliate station of the Radyo Bandera Network. The station's studio and transmitter are located at Brgy. Poblacion, Mabinay, Negros Oriental.

Programming
JU FM's weekday line-up is composed of locally produced news, commentary and public affairs programming in the morning, lunchtime, afternoon and early-evening timeslots. Blocktimers, music and entertainment programs fill the remainder of the schedule. Simulcasts of programming from Radyo Bandera Sweet FM (RBSFM) Dumaguete are also aired, primarily in the mid-morning and early-afternoon timeslots.

Saturdays feature a mix of news/talk and music programs throughout the broadcast day, most of which are presented by the station's on-air personalities. On Sundays, music and entertainment shows fill the majority of the schedule, including a few blocktime programs.

References

External links
 Facebook page

Radio stations in Negros Oriental